Blackfriars Pier is a pier on the River Thames, in the Blackfriars area of the City of London, United Kingdom. It is served by boats operating under licence from London River Services and is situated on the north bank of the Thames, adjacent to Blackfriars Bridge.

Blackfriars Millennium Pier is a major transport interchange being close to Blackfriars rail and tube station, providing direct interchange with Thameslink and South Eastern rail services, and with the London Underground Circle and District Lines. The Pier is seen predominantly as a commuter pier and thus is not typically served by River Bus services during weekend and bank holiday periods.

History 
The original Blackfriars Millennium Pier was made in 2000. It was funded by the City of London Corporation and London Transport.

Services
The pier is served by river bus service route RB6 to Putney and route RB1 between Embankment and Woolwich Arsenal operated by Thames Clippers. Thames Tigers operate daily scheduled services and private charter trips from the pier.

Connections
Blackfriars station

Gallery

Lines

External links

Thames Clippers
London River Services

London River Services
Piers in London
Buildings and structures celebrating the third millennium
Transport in the City of London